Selin Ekiz (born September 27, 1989 in İstanbul, Turkey) is a Turkish female basketball player. The young national plays for Fenerbahçe İstanbul as center position. She is 190 cm tall and 80 kg weights. She is playing for Fenerbahçe İstanbul since 2001 in youth level and since 2006-07 in senior level. She played 60 times for Turkey national women's basketball team.

Honors
Turkish Championship
Winners (1): 2007
Turkish Cup
Winners (1): 2007
Turkish Presidents Cup
Winners (1): 2007

See also
 Turkish women in sports

External links
Player profile at fenerbahce.org

1989 births
Living people
Turkish women's basketball players
Fenerbahçe women's basketball players